California during World War II was a major contributor to the World War II effort. California's long Pacific Ocean coastline provided the support needed for the Pacific War. California also supported the war in Europe. After the Japanese attack on Pearl Harbor, Hawaii, on December 7, 1941, most of California's manufacturing was shifted to the war effort. California became a major ship builder and aircraft manufacturer. Existing military installations were enlarged and many new ones were built. California trained many of the troops before their oversea deployment. Over 800,000 Californians served in the United States Armed Forces. California agriculture, ranches and farms were used to feed the troops around the world. California's long coastline also put the state in fear, as an attack on California seemed likely. California was used for the temporary and permanent internment camps for Japanese Americans. The population of California grew significantly, largely due to servicemen who were stationed at the new military bases/training facilities and mass influx of workers from around the U.S. in the growing defense industries. With all the new economy activity, California was lifted out of the great depression. Over 500,000 people moved to California from other states to work in the growing economy. California expanded its oil and mineral production to keep up with the war demand.

History

Economics and population growth

A total of 12% of all U.S. Government war contracts were awarded to California companies. A total of 17% of the war materials were made in California. Mining, natural gas, and oil production were active industries in California before World War II, and these rapidly expanded to support the war effort. Like World War I, the mines and mining towns came to life again, due to an increase in demand for gold, copper, and silver. California oil production doubled, the synthetic rubber industry created in California and California agricultural output almost tripled. In 1941 California oil production was 230,263,000 barrels; by the end of the war in 1945 the output was 326,555,000 barrels. Raw material was also shipped to California from Lend lease U.S. Allies. After the attack on Pearl Harbor and America entered the war, there was a quick build of new military bases, airfields, training camps, and other military installations. New military construction projects and the emerging war industries in California brought in tens of thousands of workers from across America. After the war, many stayed in California, with some others returning to their home states. Towns and cities next to military and industrial facilities grew and had an increase in the economy. California's population in 1940 was 6,907,387 and by 1950 it had grown to 10,586,223, a 53.3% increase. California received one eighth of all war orders. With the manpower shortage many women entered the workforce in manufacturing and other jobs held by men in the past. As factories added more shifts, a variety of stores and services increase operating hours. To retain workers, some businesses increased their employee benefits. Many military personnel who were trained in California returned after the war to tour the state, so California's tourist industries began to grow.

Food production

California's mild climate made it ideal for year-round food production. With many men overseas, there was labor shortage at harvest time. The need for extra workers at harvest brought in  housewives, students and Scouts. Some businesses even loaned workers to help with harvest and food packing as needed. The Woman's Land Army of America was one of the organizations helping in food production. Even with the increase in food production there was mandatory food rationing. Civilians were encouraged to plant Victory gardens to help with the food shortage. The slogan "grow your own, can your own", was started at start of the war and referred to families growing and canning their own food in victory gardens. With its mild climate most victory gardens were grown almost year-round. Tires and gasoline were also rationed.
Rationing of wool fabric was also required during the war. This is one of the causes of the June 1943 Zoot Suit Riots in Los Angeles.

Enemy aliens

 After the attack on Pearl Harbor it was feared that some Japanese Americans might be loyal to the Empire of Japan and the Emperor of Japan. On February 19, 1942, President Franklin D. Roosevelt signed Executive Order 9066, which authorized the Secretary of War to set some military zones for the internment of Japanese Americans. California had some of the U.S. prisoner of war camps and Japanese Americans internment camps. War Relocation Authority built both temporary and permanent relocation camps. As aliens they had to register in accordance with the law and were required to turn in all weapons and short-wave radios. Japanese Americans first were sent to one of California's 11 temporary relocation camps, like the two in southern California: Pomona assembly center and the Santa Anita assembly center. From these centers many were sent to other states and some were sent to California's Manzanar War Relocation Center, California or the Tule Lake War Relocation Center. Even with internment, a number of American-born Japanese (or Nisei) volunteered to join the U.S. armed services. The Nisei units fought well and are highly decorated units. Nisei joined all the U.S. armed branches, most joined the U.S. Army.
 Camp Haan was built at near March Air Reserve Base, the camp housed 1,200 Italian prisoners of war (POW). German POWs were also housed at the camp. The camp was named after Major General William G. Haan. In all 21 POW camps were built in California. A number of Italian POWs, pledged to help the United States. About 70% to 90% of the Italian POWs volunteered for Italian Service Units (ISU). Due to labor shortage the Italian Service Units helped on Army depots, arsenals, farms and hospitals, there they volunteered to work and received better housing, than the standard POW camps. Camp Lamont was used for German POW volunteers to work on crops. Camp Cooke held German POWs, now the site of Vandenberg Air Force Base. The Stockton Ordnance Depot held 1,500 German prisoners from May 1944 till June 1946.

Attacks on California

 On February 23, 1942, the Japanese bombed the Ellwood Oil Field. The Ellwood Oil Field and oil refinery are located in Goleta, California in the Santa Barbara Channel. Japanese submarine I-17 fired 16 shells at the Oil Field from its deck gun before running. This attack along with the Niihau Incident started the fear of the invasion of California. There was great fear that the battle group that attacked Hawaii would come to California next. This also started the idea of the internment of Japanese Americans.  There were no casualties in the attack. The total cost of the damage was approximately $1,000 (about $18,178 in 2022) . News of the attack triggered an invasion scare along the West Coast of the United States.
 Fu-Go balloon bombs were the other attack on California and 14 other states. Japanese launched fire bomb balloons across the Pacific Ocean. These high-altitude balloons carried bombs and incendiary explosives. In California 25 fire bomb balloons were found, none caused injuries in California. The balloon bombs were launched in Japan from November 3, 1944, to April 1945. On February 23, 1945, a P-38 Lightning plane shot down a balloon near Santa Rosa, California. On January 10, 1945, an Army P-38 shot down a Fu-Go balloon near Alturas, California
 Ships off the California coast were attacked:  (escaped),  (sank),  (escaped),  (sank),  (damaged), SS H.M. Storey (escaped, sank later), SS Camden (sank),  (damaged),  (sank),  (escaped), SS Connecticut (damaged),  (Sank), and SS Idaho [tanker] (minor damage). In the attacks, eight seamen were killed and others injured. After the attack on Pearl Harbor the Imperial Japanese Navy sent five Submarines, I-17, I-19, I-23 I-25 and I-26, to attack ships off coastal California.
 Due to fear California coastal cities turned off lights or blacked out windows at night. Some sandbagged their homes and businesses. Some radio stations went off the air and civil ships were ordered to stay in port. Commercial air travel was grounded. A military defense system was installed up and down the coast, that included blimps, patrol ships, artillery batteries, and aircraft.
 The great sense of fear caused what is called the Battle of Los Angeles. On February 24 and 25, 1942 Los Angeles thought it was under attack and so 1,440 rounds of U.S. anti-aircraft ammunition was fired at what turned out to be a non-existent enemy. Reports of an unidentified aircraft started blackout and shooting of reported incoming aircraft. There was crazed and inaccurate reporting of the event at the time. The only damage in the city was self-inflicted from anti-aircraft fire coming down. The event exposed the defenselessness of the West Coast, as California was defended by only 16 modern warplanes at the time.
 After the war it was learned that there was a planned December 24, 1941 attack on San Diego Bay. Japanese submarine I-10 was to be the leader of seven other submarines that were to shell the U.S. Navy at San Diego Bay. The attack was called off with the subs only 20 miles off the California coast.

Ammunition

California was a major ammunition manufacturer for the war. Off the California coast, ships worked around the clock to harvest kelp of the vast California kelp forest. The kelp's nitrate, actin and potash was used in the making of gunpowder. The largest World War II accident in California was the Port Chicago disaster. The Liberty ship SS E. A. Bryan exploded on July 17, 1944, while being loaded with ammunition. About 4,600 tons (4,173 tonnes) of explosives had been loaded in the ship's holds at the time. The explosion killed 320 sailors and civilians and injured 390 others. , situated next to SS E. A. Bryan, was destroyed and a United States Coast Guard fireboat sank. The trains at the port, the port's buildings and much of the surrounding town were severely damaged. Riverbank Army Ammunition Plant in Stanislaus County and Benicia Arsenal were two of the largest ammunition makers. In San Bernardino the Western Stove Company built incendiary bombs. Three California Victory ships loaded with 6,000 pounds (2,700 kg) of ammunition for troops in the Pacific sank after Kamikaze attacks.

Hollywood

Hollywood's motion-picture industry continued to make movies during the war. In addition to entertainment films, Hollywood made training films and films to raise morale. The 1942 film The Arm Behind the Army showed how important home support of the war was.

Bob Hope volunteered with the United Service Organizations (USO) and entertained troops during World War II and for decades later (1941 to 1991). Hope brought many Hollywood stars with him on his USO tours.  Overlapping with this was his movie career, spanning 1934 to 1972, and his USO tours, which he conducted from 1941 to 1991.

Desi Arnaz was stationed at Birmingham General Army Hospital in Van Nuys, California  during the war to entertain the troops there. Arnaz had a bad knee and so was transferred to the US Army Medical Corps. Arnaz also coordinated with the stars that visited the hospital. Arnaz was discharged on November 16, 1945.

War Bond sales

To help pay for the war the U.S. sold war bonds. With its booming economy during World War II, Californians was one of the top of U.S. War Bonds sold. Much of the advertising for war bonds was donated. The spirit of sacrifice was never stronger for the defense of democracy and a way of honoring the sacrifices of American troops.  Named after the 1942 Hollywood Victory Caravan, Paramount-produced film promoted bond sales in a 1945, post War. The short film included Bing Crosby, Bob Hope, Alan Ladd, William Demarest, Franlin Pangborn, Barbara Stanwyck, Humphrey Bogart, and others. Other heroes like boxing Joe Louis and Joe DiMaggio sold war bonds. Albert Einstein donated the original copies of his manuscript on the theory of relativity for auction to raise money for war bonds.

California National Guard
California National Guard was mobilized and called to active duty in August 1940. The US Army recruited the first group to deploy to the war in Europe. The others troops called up were sent to the Pacific war. Between 1940 and 1941 about 12,000 California National Guard troops were called up to service in federal duty. Some troops were used for the defense of California and Hawaii. California National Guard was used for coast patrols, security guards for the Army Air Force bases, railroad bridges, rail tunnels and major dams. Major training bases are Camp Roberts and Camp San Luis Obispo.

Civil defense

Due to the attack on Pearl Harbor and on California civil defense systems were started in California. Office of Civilian Defense was founded on  May 20, 1941, and the Office of Civil Defense in May 1941. The Civil Air Patrol was started on December 1, 1941, in which civilian planes and spotters were used in air reconnaissance, search-and-rescue, and transport. After the attacks on California the Coast Guard Auxiliary, became very active in the use of civilian boats and crews for reconnaissance and search-and-rescue. Towers were built along coastal California, staffed with spotters to look for enemy aircraft working with the Ground Observer Corps.
In February 1942 the Federal government started War Time, ending in September 1945. With War Time California time was renamed to Pacific War Time with special Daylight Savings times. The Women Airforce Service Pilots (WASP) started on August 5, 1943, used 1,074 civilian women pilots to fly new warplanes from the factories to Army airfields for training and deployment points. WASP pilots also towed targets for live anti-aircraft artillery practice, towed gliders for practice landings, simulated strafing missions, and transported cargo. WASP California headquarters was at Santa Ana Army Air Base, Merced Army Airfield, Minter Field, and Victorville Army Airfield  Cal Aero Academy was a private flying academy hired by the Army Air Forces for pilot training.

Railroads

American railroads moved 70% of all freight transported in the United States in 1940. During World War II the passenger and freight volume increased vastly. Railroads moved about 90% of the military's need cargo and transported 98% of military personnel. Railroads worked overtime to keep up with demand. It was patriotic to avoid all unnecessary travel, to give space needed for troop movement. Railroad brought troop to California training centers and camps. Railroad brought workers to California's growing defense industry. During World War II rail-line moved to Diesel locomotives and away from the labor-intensive steam locomotives.  The Army had special hospital cars built to move wounded soldiers, one operated out of San Francisco. Many cities still had local tram services like Los Angeles vast Pacific Electric system.

Research

The development of new systems was a key to winning the war. World War 2 brought about many new technologies. Some California colleges and universities joined in the V-12 Navy College Training Program training volunteers for Navy commission. Some California universities also had classes for aeronautical engineering, resident inspectors of ordinance and naval material, and a liaison for the National Defense Research Committee.
 Los Alamos National Laboratory – Top secret Manhattan Project
 California Institute of Technology – aeronautical – wind tunnels – rocketry
 University of California, Berkeley – Manhattan Project
 Stanford University – radar microwave research
 University of California-San Diego – Frequency modulation Sonar to track multiple targets with a single ping and large Sonar crystals.
 University of California, Riverside – V-12 Navy College
 University of California, Los Angeles – V-12 Navy College – Scuba diving
 Occidental College – V-12 Navy College
 Early Penicillin experiments were done at the Kaiser Richmond Shipyards.
 Skunk Works – Planes and jets
 Hewlett-Packard built oscillators for proximity fuze and microwave Signal generator used in radar and counter-radar measures.
 Hedy Lamarr Hollywood actor with George Antheil invented Frequency-hopping spread spectrum for the Navy.

Veterans

After the war Operation Magic Carpet started to bring the troops home, some brought home war brides. On October 30, 1944, Governor Earl Warren started the California Veteran's Commission. The Commission worked to help veterans re-entry into civilian life. The Commission working with United States Department of Veterans Affairs, California Military Department, state agencies, local governments, and community groups like: American Legion, Veterans of Foreign Wars, and Disabled American Veterans. Many Veterans Health Administration facilities were opened in the state. Veteran's Bond Act of 1943 helped veterans to purchase a home or farm. Veterans started families, that is called the baby boom, birth rates increased in the U.S. and California.

Manufacturing

Ship building

California became a major builder of ships for the war. Under the Emergency Shipbuilding program, cargo ships like Liberty ships and Victory ships were built in days, not the normal months. Ships that could be repaired overseas greatly reduced repair time, so California shipyards also built floating dry docks like the Large Auxiliary Floating Dry Docks and Medium Auxiliary Floating Dry Docks. As fear of an attack on California seemed likely, the War Department requested some ships be built at an inland ports, so many new ships were built at the Port of Stockton, seventy nautical miles from the ocean. Henry J. Kaiser built day care centers at his shipyards in Richmond. Kaiser Steel was headquartered in Fontana, California. Some of the ships were given to the Allies of World War II through the Lend-Lease act of March 11, 1941. At the end of the war there was a surplus of ships and most shipyards were closed. Surplus ships were either sold or put into the Navy Reserve Fleet, like the Suisun Bay Reserve Fleet. California ship yards:

Los Angeles

Major
 California Shipbuilding on Terminal Island, a Bechtel shipyard
 306 Liberty cargo ships
 101 Victory cargo ships
 30 attack transports (Victory hulls)
 30 tankers (Liberty hulls)
 Consolidated Steel Corporation in Wilmington and Long Beach
 2 P1 attack transports
 10 C2
 78 C1-B and C1-S-AY1
 55 C1-M-AV1
 32 attack transports
 18 frigates
 Bethlehem Shipbuilding San Pedro on Terminal Island, 26 destroyers
 Todd Pacific Shipyards, Los Angeles Division San Pedro
 10 large auxiliaries
 formerly Los Angeles Shipbuilding and Drydock Corporation, change of management during the war
 Western Pipe and Steel, 12 destroyer escorts, 11 cutters, 7 icebreakers, 32 LSM
 not to be confused with Western's primary shipyard in South San Francisco
Minor
 Hodgson-Greene-Haldeman, Long Beach, Type V ship wood tugboats.
 Fellows & Stewart in Wilmington, Sub chaser and rescue boat 
 Harbor Boatbuilding at Terminal Island, Minesweeper, Torpedo Boat, Sub Chaser, & rescue boat 
 Wilmington Boat Works in Wilmington, Sub Chaser, Harbor Tug, Rescue boat
 Pacific Boat, Terminal Island, Wood BC Deck Barge
 Patten-Blinn Lumber, Los Angeles, Knockdown Wood BK Barge
 Long Beach Boat, Long Beach  Army J Boat
 J. E. Haddock Company, San Pedro, AFDL42 Float dock
 Al Larson Boat Shop in San Pedro, Minesweeper and Sub Chaser
 American Pipe in Los Angeles, Barges
 Standard Steel in Los Angeles, Steel Barge BK
 Ashbridge Boatworks  Los Angeles Army J Passenger Boat
 San Pedro Boatworks, San Pedro, Army J Patrol Boat
 Garbutt-Walsh Inc. in San Pedro, covered Barge
 Wilson Company in Wilmington, US Army Tug
 United Concrete Pipe Corporation in Long Beach ships
 Peyton Company in Newport Beach, Sub Chaser and Harbor Tug
 Ackerman Boat in Newport Beach, Sub Chaser and Harbor Tug

San Francisco

Major
 Bethlehem Shipbuilding Corporation
 Union Iron Works
 4 cruisers, 36 destroyers, 12 destroyer escorts
 5 C1-B cargo in 1940/1941
 Alameda Works Shipyard
 8 P2 transports
 Richmond Shipyards :
 Kaiser Richmond No. 1 Yard; Oceans, Libertys, Victorys
 Kaiser Richmond No. 2 Yard; Liberty, Victory 
 Kaiser Richmond No. 3 Yard; Type C4-class ship
 Kaiser Richmond No. 4 Yard; Landing Ship, Tanks (LST)s, Tugs
 Mare Island Naval Shipyard in Vallejo, 31 destroyer escorts, 18 submarines
 Moore Dry Dock Company in Oakland,  C2 Cargo
 Western Pipe and Steel Company in San Francisco, Cargo
 Marinship, in Sausalito, a Bechtel shipyard
 78 T2 tankers, 15 Liberty ships

Minor
 Oakland Estuary
 United Engineering Company, 21 fleet tugs
 General Engineering, 23 steel minesweepers and 4 steel net layers
 Pacific Coast Engineering
 Pacific Bridge Company
 Cryer & Sons, Four Navy coastal cargo ships 
 W. F. Stone & Son, Minesweeper, Tug and Sub Chaser 
 Independent Iron Works, Barge
 Poole & McGonigle, YFD-19  
 Hunters Point Naval Shipyard (repairs only?)
 Kneass Boat Works in San Francisco  Five Sub Chaser and a Tug
 Hunt Marine Service in Richmond, patrol boat, tug
 Soule Steel in San Francisco, Barge
 Judson Pacific, San Francisco, Steel BG  Gasoline Barge
 Barrett & Hilp in San Francisco,  concrete barge
 Anderson & Cristofani in San Francisco  Patrol Craft (YP), APc 
 California Steel Products in Richmond,  Gasoline Barge
 Martinolich Shipbuilding Company, San Francisco, Self-Propelled Barge
 Madden, Lewis in Sausalito, Tug
 Sausalito Shipbuilding in Sausalito, Steel Barges

Other
 Pollock-Stockton Shipbuilding Company in Stockton, Net layer, Dry Dock
 Eureka Shipbuilding, Fields Landing  tugboats
 Concrete Ship Constructors in National City  Type B ship barges
 Barrett & Hilp, Concrete Ships in South San Francisco – barges
 Colberg Boat Works in Stockton, Minesweeper, Tug, Sub chaser
 Stephens Bros. Boat Builders in Stockton,  Picket Boat, Tug, Rescue Boat
 Hickinbotham Brothers in Stockton  (Guntert and Zimmerman ), Barge, Cargo, Tug
 Kyle and Company in Stockton, Coastal tanker
 Clyde W. Wood in Stockton, Tug, Cargo
 Nicholson, D. W. in Stockton, San Leandro and Oakland,  Wood BC Deck barge
 Stockton Steel Fabrications Company in Stockton
 Basalt Rock Company in Napa, Rescue Ship, barge
 Campbell Industries in San Diego, four minesweepers
 Fulton Shipyard in Antioch, Minesweeper, Tug, and Troopship
 Chicago Bridge Eureka,  Eureka, AFDM
 National Steel and Shipbuilding Company NASSCO in San Diego, US Army KD Barges
 Lynch Shipbuilding in San Diego, Rescue Tug and Coastal cargo
 San Diego Marine,  San Diego, Minesweeper and Sub Chaser  
 South Coast Shipbuilding in Newport Beach, Minesweeper, Sub Chaser and Crash boat
 Victory Shipbuilding in Newport Beach, Harbor Tug and Sub Chaser
 Moore Equipment Company  in Stockton YSD
 Aetna Iron & Steel in San Diego  YSR Barge  
 Sacramento Shipbuilders in Sacramento, Barge
 Stanwood Shipyard in Stanwood, BCL Wood Barge
 Krem, Kau & Son, Pittsburg, Army J Passenger Boat
 Steinbrenner, Otto, Sacramento, Wood BC Deck Barge
 Olson Lumber, Alhambra,  Knockdown Wood BK Barge
 National Iron Works,  San Diego, Knockdown Steel BK Barge

Aircraft manufacturers

Built in California during World War 2 were: B-17 Flying Fortress, Lockheed P-38 Lightning, Douglas C-47 Skytrain, Douglas SBD Dauntless, Douglas A-26 Invader, Lockheed Ventura, Lockheed Model 18 Lodestar, Lockheed P-2 Neptune, Lockheed Constellation, Douglas P-70 Nighthawk, Douglas DC-5, Douglas C-54 Skymaster, Douglas BTD Destroyer, Douglas A-33, Douglas TBD Devastator, Consolidated PB4Y-2 Privateer, Northrop A-17, Northrop BT, Northrop N-3PB, Northrop P-61 Black Widow, McDonnell FH Phantom, Consolidated B-24 Liberator, Consolidated PB2Y Coronado, Consolidated TBY Sea Wolf, Consolidated B-32 Dominator, Consolidated P-30, North American B-25 Mitchell, North American P-51 Mustang, Vultee A-31 Vengeance, Vultee BT-13 Valiant, Vultee P-66 Vanguard, Vultee V-11, Interstate Cadet, North American T-6 Texan, Douglas A-20 Havoc, Lockheed C-69 Constellation, Consolidated PBY Catalina, Interstate TDR, Timm N2T Tutor, Ryan PT-22 Recruit, Ryan ST and the Waco CG-4 / Timm CG-4A . The Lockheed Hudson built in Burbank was delivered to Canada and then the United Kingdom starting in 1939. By the end of the war California had 70% of the aerospace manufacturing in the United States and had built over 200,000 planes. Hughes H-4 Hercules, Victory Trainer and Bartlett Zephyr were built in California, but not used.  The California Institute of Technology in Pasadena, California started a School of Aeronautics and other aeronautic research labs in the early 1920s, this helped California become a major aerospace manufacturing center.

Aircraft manufacturers of World War II in California:

 Douglas Aircraft Company in Santa Monica, El Segundo, Long Beach, and Torrance
 Lockheed Corporation in Burbank
 Vega Aircraft Corporation in Burbank
 Northrop Corporation in Hawthorne
 Hughes Aircraft Company in Playa Vista and Culver City
 McDonnell Aircraft Corporation in Long Beach
 Consolidated Aircraft in San Diego
 Ryan Aeronautical in San Diego
 North American Aviation in Inglewood
 Glenn L. Martin Company in Santa Ana, HQ and design only
 Harlow Aircraft Company in Alhambra
 Convair in San Diego
 Vultee Aircraft in Burbank and Downey
 Interstate Aircraft in  El Segundo
 O.W. Timm Aircraft Company in Van Nuys
 Bartlett Aircraft in Rosemead
 Hiller Aircraft in Berkeley
 Morrow Aircraft Corporation in San Bernardino
 Skunk Works design HQ in Burbank

Vehicles manufacturers

During World War II all California civilian automobile manufacturing ended.
 General Motors South Gate Assembly built Stuart M-5 and M5A1 Light Tanks at 500 per month.
 General Motors Oakland Assembly built Pratt & Whitney aircraft engines and munitions.
 Ford Motor Company Assembly Plant in Richmond built 49,399 jeeps. The Ford plant also did completion work on tanks, armored personnel carriers, armored cars and other military vehicles. Ford's Long Beach plant was leased to the Air Force and used as an Air Base.
 Willys-Overland Maywood, California plant was used by Lockheed to build subassemblies for Lockheed Hudson.
 Chrysler of California, Los Angeles, built 12,214 aircraft engines, 4,100 B-17 cabins and 688 PV-2 Harpoon cabins.
 Studebaker Pacific Corporation of Los Angeles built engines for the B-17s and PV-2 Harpoons being built in Burbank.
 Menasco Motors Company in Burbank, built aircraft landing gear for North American, Lockheed, Republic, General Dynamics, and other aircraft manufacturers. Menasco continued this work after the war.
 Firestone Tire and Rubber Company of Los Angeles built 1,550 turrets used on M5 tanks. Firestone also built 3,100 M5 tank tracks.

Engine Manufacturers

Joshua Hendy Iron Works was the biggest supplier of reciprocating engines for Liberty ships in the country. It was also the
only manufacturer of large steam turbine propulsion systems on the West Coast.

 Marine triple expansion reciprocating
 Joshua Hendy Iron Works in Sunnyvale
 Marine diesel
 Enterprise Engine and Foundry Co. in San Francisco
 Atlas-Imperial in Oakland
 Marine steam turbines
 Joshua Hendy in Sunnyvale

Military installations
Like other states in the desert Southwest, many of the new military installations built were United States Army airbases. California's weather, wide open spaces, railroad connections, and access to ocean made it an ideal location for training pilots, also armored vehicles operators.

Desert Training Center

The largest United States Army training installation in the history of the United States was the Desert Training Center. To prepare troops for the battles in the North African campaign, the army had General Patton build many desert training camps in Southern California and a few in Arizona. The camps were built in the Mojave Desert and Sonoran Desert. The open space let the Army and Army Air Corps use live fire to train troops, test and develop equipment. Tactical doctrines, techniques, and training methods for combat were developed from this training. From 1 April 1942 to 1 July 1944, the complete training area covered 18,000 square miles. The camp reached from Pomona, California east to almost to Phoenix, Arizona and from Yuma, Arizona northward into the southern tip of Nevada.

California Army Divisional Camps
 Camp Clipper and Camp Essex
 Camp Coxcomb
 Camp Granite
 Camp Ibis
 Camp Iron Mountain
 Camp Pilot Knob
 Camp Young – Desert Training Center Headquarters

California Army Depots
 Camp Freda Quartermaster Depot
 Camp Desert Center
 Camp Goffs – Depot and Infantry training.
 Pomona Ordnance Depot

California Army Airfields

 Major airfields
 Blythe Army Air Base
 Desert Center Army Airfield
 Thermal Army Airfield
 Rice Army Airfield
 Shavers Summit Army Airfield (now Chiriaco Summit Airport)
 Minor airfields
 Camp Coxcomb Army Field (abandoned)
 Camp Essex Army Field (abandoned)
 Camp Goffs Army Field (abandoned)
 Camp Ibis Army Field (abandoned)
 Camp Iron Mountain Army Field

Desert Training Center California Hospitals
 Banning General Hospital (Banning, CA)
 Camp Freda Hospital
 Camp Desert Center Hospital
 Camp Goffs Hospital
 Torney General Hospital
 Needles Station Hospital
 Cherry Valley Hospital

US Army Bases
For World War 2 existing California Army bases were enlarged and many new bases were built. Bases were used for induction, training, deployment, supply depots, hospitals and housing of POWs.

 Fort Irwin
 Fort Ord
 Camp Funston
 Fort Hunter Liggett
 Parks Reserve Forces Training Area
 Presidio of Monterey
 Military Ocean Terminal Concord
 Camp Anza
 Camp Callan
 Camp Kearny
 Salinas Garrison
 Camp Lockett
 Fort Emory
 Oakland Army Base
 Fort Funston
 Fort MacArthur
 Camp Ashby
 Fort Mason
 Fort McDowell
 Fort Miley Military Reservation
 Camp McQuaide
 Camp Stoneman
 Fort Point
 Letterman Army Hospital
 Hoff General Hospital
 Fort Baker
 Fort Bragg
 Camp Tanforan
 Oakland Army Base
 Presidio of San Francisco
 Sacramento Army Depot
 San Carlos War Dog Training Center
 Camp Seeley El Centro
 Camp Pinedale
 Fresno Army Air Forces Training Center
 Santa Anita Ordnance Training Center
 Camp Roberts Army Base Monterey
 Camp San Luis Obispo, (Camp Merriam)
 San Joaquin Depot
 Sharpe Facility
 Tracy Facility
 Lathrop Holding and Reconsignment
 Lathrop Engineering Depot
 Stockton Ordnance Depot
 Sierra Army Depot in Herlong
 Birmingham General Hospital
 Mitchell Convalescent Hospital
 Camp Ross
 Benicia Arsenal
 Camp Ono for POWs
 Fort Barry
 Fort Cronkhite
 Fort Ord Station Veterinary Hospital
 DeWitt General Hospital
 Camp Kohler
 Camp Shoemaker
 Camp Flint
 Camp Tulelake
 Camp Tracy
 Radar Station B-71
 Battery Chamberlin
 Camp Lamont for POWs
 Milagra Ridge Military Reservation
 Camp Ayres – Chino Supply Depot – Camp Chino
 Pillar Point Military Reservation
 Santa Monica Army Air Forces Redistribution Center
 Hammond General Hospital

Air bases and airfield

Existing United States Army Air Corps air bases were enlarged to house and train the many new crews needed. Almost all civilian airports and airstrips were converted to Army Air training centers. Almost all civilian air flights were cancelled. Many new airstrips and landing pads were built for pilot landing and take-off training. Air bases had housing and meals for the troops. Some airstrips and landing pads had no support buildings, as they were used only for landing and take-off training.
United States Army Air Corps World War II bases, airstrips and landing pads in California:

 Beale Air Force Base (Camp Beale), Marysville
 Muroc Army Airfield now Edwards Air Force Base
 March Field, Riverside
 McClellan Air Force Base, Sacramento
 Fairfield-Suisun Air Force Base now Travis Air Force Base
 Camp Cooke now Vandenberg Air Force Base, Lompoc
 Los Alamitos Joint Forces Training Base
 Lemoore Army Air Field
 Long Beach Army Air Field
 Lomita Flight Strip
 Ontario Army Air Field
 San Bernardino Army Air Field
 Van Nuys Army Air Field
 Chino Airport
 Oxnard Air Force Base
 Clover Field
 Merced Army Air Field
 Camp Merced
 Grand Central Air Terminal
 Lockheed Air Terminal
 Mines Field
 Victorville Army Air Field
 Hamilton Army Airfield
 Bakersfield Army Air Field
 Mather Air Force Base
 Norton Air Force Base
 Naval Auxiliary Air Station Salton Sea
 McClellan Field
 McChesney Field
 Hammer Field
 Santa Monica Army Air Base
 Gardner Army Airfield
 Bicycle Lake Army Airfield
 Minter Field
 Santa Maria Army Air Field
 Lookout Mountain Air Force Station
 Chico Field
 Wendover Air Force Base`
 Santa Ana Army Air Base
 Palm Springs Air Base
 Fresno Air Base
 Chiriaco Summit Airport
 Bishop Army Airfield
 Blythe Army Airfield
 Palmdale Army Airfield
 Gary Army Airfield
 Oakland Municipal Airport
 Chico Army Air Field
 Reno Army Air Base
 Barstow-Daggett Airport
 Mira Loma Quartermaster Depot
 Montague Air Force Auxiliary Field
 Napa Army Airfield
 Willows Municipal Airport
 Redding Army Airfield
 Siskiyou County Army Airfield
 Salinas Army Air Base
 Delano Army Airfield
 Capitola Airport
 Meadows Field
 Visalia Army Airfield
 Hayward Army Airfield
 Orland Auxiliary Field
 Kirkwood Auxiliary Field
 Vina Auxiliary Field
 Campbell Auxiliary Field
 Oroville Auxiliary Field
 Sacramento Municipal Airport
 Oroville Army Airfield
 Siskiyou County Army Airfield
 Redding Army Airfield
 Boston Field
 Huron Field
 Indian Field
 Murray Field
 West Field
 Helm Field
 Corcoran Municipal Airport
 Porterville Army Airfield
 Coalinga Municipal Airport (Old)
 Buffalo Springs Airport
 Needles Army Airfield
 Shavers Summit Army Airfield
 Rice Army Airfield
 Half Moon Bay Flight Strip
 Estrella Army Airfield
 Santa Rosa Army Airfield
 Thermal Army Airfield
 Corcoran Airport
 Douthitt Strip
 Dos Palos Airport
 Trauger Auxiliary Field
 Hunter Auxiliary Field
 Caliente Flight Strip
 Franklin Auxiliary Airfield
 Hawthorne Municipal Airport
 Hayward Executive Airport
 Hemet-Ryan Airport
 Independence Airport
 Inyo County Airport
 Lancaster Airport
 Adamson Landing Field
 Mefford Field Airport
 Palo Alto Airport
 Gibbs Auxiliary Field
 New Jerusalem Auxiliary Airfield
 Porterville Army Airfield
 Rankin Field
 Redding Army Air Field
 Lindbergh Field
 San Francisco Airport
 Sequoia Field
 Stockton Army Airfield
 Sherman Army Airfield
 Kingsbury Auxiliary Airfield
 Tracy Auxiliary Airfield
 Modesto Auxiliary Airfield
 Twenty Nine Palms Army Airfield
 Visalia Army Air Field
 War Eagle Field
 Willows-Glenn Airport
 Winters-Davis Flight Strip
 Marysville Army Airfield
 Parker Auxiliary Airfield
 Kern Field Auxiliary Airfield
 Allen Auxiliary Airfield
 Conners Auxiliary Airfield
 Taft Auxiliary Airfield
 Cuyama Auxiliary Airfield
 Wasco Auxiliary Airfield
 Pond Auxiliary Field
 Famoso Auxiliary Airfield
 Dunlap Auxiliary Airfield
 Semi-tropic Auxiliary Airfield
 Poso Auxiliary Airfield
 Lost Hills Auxiliary Airfield,
 Hawes Auxiliary Airfield
 Helendale Auxiliary Airfield
 Howard Auxiliary Field
 Athlone Auxiliary Field
 Potter Auxiliary Field
 Liberty Auxiliary Field
 Victory Field Auxiliary Field
 Grand Central Air Terminal
 Montgomery Field
 Condor Field
 Fort Ord Army Airfield
 Fritzsche AAF
 Panamint Spring Auxiliary Airfield
 Peik Auxiliary Field

US Naval Bases
United States Navy's main marine bases were located in the deepwater ports of: San Diego Bay, Port of Los Angeles, San Francisco Bay and the Stockton Deepwater Shipping Channel. The US Navy during WW2 Pacific Fleet operated: ports, supply depots and airfields for aircraft carrier training, also blimps used for patrol of the coast. Post World War II many shipyards became home of the Pacific Reserve Fleet used to store the many surplus ships.
United States Navy World War II bases and stations in California:

 Mare Island Naval Shipyard, Vallejo, California, with Mare Island Naval Hospital
 Naval Base San Diego, San Diego
 Hunters Point Naval Shipyard
 Naval Air Weapons Station China Lake, China Lake Armitage Field
 Naval Base Ventura County, Point Mugu
 San Francisco Bay Naval Shipyard
 Hunters Point Naval Shipyard
 Naval Postgraduate School, Monterey
 Naval Air Station Alameda
 Naval Weapons Station Seal Beach, Seal Beach
 Naval Air Station Point Mugu, Point Mugu
 Naval Construction Battalion Center Port Hueneme
 Parks Reserve Forces Training Area
 Naval Hospital Santa Margarita Ranch
 Naval Reserve Center Santa Barbara
 Naval Medical Center San Diego
 Naval Medical Research Unit One
 Naval Air Station North Island, San Diego
 Fort Rosecrans, now Naval Base Point Loma
 Naval Air Base San Pedro
 Inyokern Auxiliary Field
 Naval Base Coronado
 Naval Construction Battalion Center Port Hueneme
 Naval Auxiliary Landing Field San Clemente Island
 Naval Auxiliary Air Station Monterey
 Long Beach Naval Shipyard
 Crescent City Outlying Field
 Army and Navy Academy
 Terminal Island San Pedro
 Point Arguello Radio Station
 Naval Auxiliary Air Station Twentynine Palms
 Naval Outlying Landing Field Imperial Beach
 Naval and Marine Corps Reserve Center  in Los Angeles
 Naval Air Station, Santa Ana
 Moffett Federal Airfield – Naval Air Station
 Naval Training Center San Diego
 Rockwell Field
 Camp Hydle
 Half Moon Bay Flight Strip
 Naval Station Treasure Island
 Naval Auxiliary Air Station Ream Field
 Morris Reservoir Naval Weapons Test Site
 Naval Outlying Landing Field San Nicolas Island
 Rough and Ready Island Naval Supply Depot in Stockton
 Naval Amphibious Base Coronado
 McCormack General Hospital
 Naval Information Warfare Center Pacific
 Watsonville Airport
 Silver Strand Training Complex
 Camp Morena
 Naval Outlying Field, Ocotillo Dry Lake
 Naval Postgraduate School
 Naval Auxiliary Air Station Vernalis
 Naval Auxiliary Air Station, San Luis Obispo
 Chocolate Mountain Aerial Gunnery Range
 Carrizo Impact Area
 Navy Broadway Complex
 Naval Air Auxiliary Station Watsonville
 Naval Auxiliary Landing Field Santa Rosa
 Naval Advance Base Personnel Depot, San Bruno
 Auxiliary Air Station Monterey
 Naval Landing Force Equipment Depot in Albany, California
 Arcata, Naval Auxiliary Air Station
 Camp Kearny
 NASA Crows Landing Airport
 Naval Hospital Corona
 NAAS Brown Field
 King City Naval Auxiliary Air Station
 Amphibious Training Base, Castroville
 U.S. Naval Air Facility Del Mar
 Del Monte Navy Pre-Flight School
 Dixon Naval Radio Transmitter Facility
 Naval Auxiliary Air Facility Lompoc
 Naval Auxiliary Air Station Hollister
 Holtville Naval Auxiliary Air Station
 Sand Hill Naval Auxiliary Landing Field
 Naval Air Station Livermore
 Naval Station Newport
 Moffett Field airship hangars
 Naval Air Transport Service
 Concord Naval Weapons Station
 Point Molate Naval Fuel Depot
 Naval Auxiliary Air Station Miramar
 V-12 Navy College in Loma Linda, Redlands, UC and Occidental College
 Long Beach Army Airfield
 Skaggs Island Naval Communication Station
 Naval Auxiliary Air Station Salton Sea
 Fleet and Industrial Supply Center, Oakland
 Naval Hospital Oakland
 United States Navy Net Depot Tiburon
 Naval Auxiliary Air Facility Mills Field
 Naval Convalescent Hospital, Santa Cruz
 Amphibious Training Base Morro Bay
 Navy Building 101 in San Francisco
 Yosemite Naval Convalescent Hospital at the Ahwahnee Hotel
 San Leandro Naval Hospital
 Treasure Island Naval Auxiliary Air Facility
 Field Clark's Dry Lake
 Borrego Hotel Naval Outlying Landing Field
 Borrego Hotel Target Area
 Benson Bombing Range
 North Coyote Wells Naval Outlying Landing Field
 South Coyote Wells Naval Outlying Landing Field
 Jacumba Airport
 Rosedale Naval Outlying Landing Field
 Border Naval Outlying Landing Field
 Ramona Landing Field
 Eureka Auxiliary Field
 Arcata Naval Auxiliary Air Station
 Naval Industrial Reserve Repair Facility, Oakland
 Naval Reserve Armory, Oakland
 Naval Hospital Long Beach
 Alameda Naval Hospital
 Naval Convalescent Hospital Beaumont
 Naval Convalescent Hospital Arrowhead Springs
 Abel Field Outlying Field
 Brown-Fabian Airport Outlying Field
 Cope Field Outlying Field
 Gelderman Airport Outlying Field
 Heath NOLF
 Linderman Airport Outlying Field
 Livermore Airport Outlying Field
 May's School Field Outlying Field
 Rita Butterworth Airport Outlying Field
 Spring Valley Airport Outlying Field
 Wagoner Airport Outlying Field
 Camp Parks
 Camp Shoemaker
 U.S. Naval Hospital Shoemaker
 Naval Outlying Landing Field Cotati
 Naval Outlying Landing Field Anaheim
 Naval Outlying Field Palisades
 Mile Square Farm Naval Outlying Field
 Haster Farm Naval Outlying Landing Field
 Horse Farm Naval Outlying Landing Field
 Seal Beach Naval Outlying Landing Field
 Otay-Mesa Naval Auxiliary Air Station
 Sweetwater Dam Naval Outlying Landing Field
 San Clemente Naval Auxiliary Air Station

US Marine Corps
Camp Pendleton became the main training grounds for training Marines including landing craft school, amphibious tractor school, beach battalion school, amphibious communications school, and a medical field service school. Skills that would be used across the island hopping in the Pacific War and the war in Europe.

 Camp Pendleton San Diego
 Marine Corps Air Station Miramar  San Diego
 Marine Corps Logistics Base Barstow Barstow, Yermo Quartermaster Sub-Depot
 Marine Corps Recruit Depot San Diego San Diego
 Marine Corps Air Station Camp Pendleton
 El Toro Marine Corps Air Station
 Tustin Marine Corps Air Station
 Marine Corps Air Station Santa Barbara
 Chocolate Mountain Aerial Gunnery Range
 Camp Elliott
 Camp Matthews
 Gillespie Field
 Camp Las Pulgas Bivouac Area
 Camp Ensign
 Ensign Ranch Airfield
 Camp Dunlap

US Coast Guard
In times of war, like during World War II, the United States Coast Guard operated as a branch of the Department of the Navy. In California the Coast Guard operated out of the 12th Naval District. Coast Guard's World War 2 Navy support included use of Coast Guard cutters, patrol boats, bases, stations and lighthouses. Patrols and search and rescue missions being the main task.

United States Coast Guard World War II bases in California:
 Coast Guard Island Alameda
 Coast Guard Air Station San Diego
 Marine Corps Logistics Base Barstow
 Coast Guard Air Station San Francisco
 Marine Corps Air Station Miramar in San Diego
 Marine Corps Recruit Depot San Diego
 Chocolate Mountain Aerial Gunnery Range
 Coast Guard Station Golden Gate
 Hamilton Cove Seaplane Base

United States Merchant Marine
The United States Merchant Marine operated merchant ships out of California US Navy and private ports to supply goods needed around the world. Most merchant ships operated with civilian merchants and US Navy armed guards to man the deck guns under the Merchant Marine Act of 1936. Merchant Marine operated many different types of ships, the most numerous type was the Liberty ships and Victory ships. Merchant Marine training was conducted by the Coast Guard.
The Maritime Service established several Merchant Marine training centers in California for World War 2:
 Port Hueneme, California (1941–1942)
 Avalon, California (1942–1945)
 Government Island, California (1938–1943) (officers training also)

Gallery

See also

 American Theater (1939–1945)
 Arizona during World War II
 Desert Training Center
 Military history of the United States during World War II
 New Mexico during World War II
 United States home front during World War II
 Arnold Scheme

References

Further reading
 Allen, Robert L. The Port Chicago Mutiny: The Story of the Largest Mass Mutiny Trial in U.S. Naval History (2006) excerpt
 Alvarez, Luis. "On Race, Riots, and Infrapolitics in Wartime Los Angeles." Revue francaise detudes americaines 1 (2012): 19–31 online
 Collins, Keith E. Black Los Angeles: The Maturing of the Ghetto, 1940–1950 (1980).
 Escobedo, Elizabeth Rachel. From coveralls to zoot suits: The lives of Mexican American women on the World War II home front (UNC Press Books, 2013).
 Foster, Mark S. "Giant of the West: Henry J. Kaiser and regional industrialization, 1930–1950." Business History Review 59.1 (1985): 1–23.
 Friedrich, Otto. City of Nets: A Portrait of Hollywood in the 1940s (Harper & Row, 1986).
 Johnson, Marilynn S. The second gold rush: Oakland and the East Bay in World War II (Univ of California Press, 1994).
 Koppes, Clayton R. and Gregory D. Black. Hollywood Goes to War: How Politics, Profits & Propaganda Shaped World War II Movies (The Free Press, 1987).
 Lange, Dorothea. Photographing the second gold rush: Dorothea Lange and the East Bay at War, 1941—1945 (Heyday Books, 1995), a primary source.
 Leonard, Kevin Allen. The Battle for Los Angeles: Racial Ideology and World War II (2006).
 Lichtenstein, Alex, and Eric Arnesen. "Labor and the Problem of Social Unity during World War II: Katherine Archibald's Wartime Shipyard in Retrospect." Labor: Studies in Working-Class History of the Americas 3.1 (2006): 113-146.
 Lotchin, Roger. "The Triumphant Partnership: California Cities and the Winning of World War II" Southern California Quarterly 88.1 (2006): 71–95. [ online]
 Lotchin, Roger W. The Bad City in the Good War: San Francisco, Los Angeles, Oakland, and San Diego (Indiana University Press, 2003)
 Lotchin, Roger W. Fortress California, 1910–1961: From Warfare to Welfare (U of Illinois Press, 2002). pp 131–170.
 Lotchin, Roger W. The Way We Really Were: The Golden State in the Second Great War (U of Illinois Press, 2000)
 Lotchin, Roger W. "California Cities and the Hurricane of Change: World War II in the San Francisco, Los Angeles, and San Diego Metropolitan Areas." Pacific Historical Review 63.3 (1994): 393–420. online
 Lotchin, Roger W. "World War II and urban California: city planning and the transformation hypothesis." Pacific Historical Review 62.2 (1993): 143-171. online
 Lothrop, Gloria Ricci. "Unwelcome in Freedom's Land: The Impact of World War II on Italian Aliens in Southern California." Southern California Quarterly 81.4 (1999): 507–544.
 McLeod, Dean L. Port Chicago (2007) excerpt
 Mitchell, Don. "Battle/fields: Braceros, agribusiness, and the violent reproduction of the California agricultural landscape during World War II." Journal of historical geography 36.2 (2010): 143-156.
 Nash, Gerald D. The American West Transformed: The Impact of the Second World War (1990)
 Parker, Dana T. Building Victory: Aircraft Manufacturing in the Los Angeles Area in World War II (2013).
 Sánchez, George J. Becoming Mexican American: Ethnicity, Culture and Identity in Chicano Los Angeles, 1900-1945 (Oxford University Press, 1993).
 Starr, Kevin. Embattled Dreams: California in War and Peace, 1940-1950 (Oxford University Press, 2002).
 Verge, Arthur C. “The Impact of the Second World War on Los Angeles.” The Pacific Historical Review 63#3 (1994): 289–314. online
 Verge, Arthur C. "World War II" in A Companion to California History ed. by William Deverell and David Igler. (2008) pp 312–321.online

Japanese internment

 Leonard, Kevin Allen. "'Is That What We Fought for?' Japanese Americans and Racism in California, The Impact of World War II." Western Historical Quarterly 21.4 (1990): 463–482. online
 Lotchin, Roger W. Japanese American Relocation in World War II: A Reconsideration (Cambridge University Press, 2018)
  Ng, Wendy L. Japanese American Internment During World War II: A History and Reference Guide (Greenwood, 2002).

External links

1940s in California

California
Economy of California
California during World War II